The 1982 Oklahoma State Cowboys baseball team represented the Oklahoma State University in the 1982 NCAA Division I baseball season. The Cowboys played their home games at Allie P. Reynolds Stadium. The team was coached by Gary Ward in his 5th year at Oklahoma State.

The Cowboys won the Midwest Regional to advance to the College World Series, where they were defeated by the Wichita State Shockers.

Roster

Schedule

! style="" | Regular Season
|- valign="top" 

|- bgcolor="#ffcccc"
| 1 || February 27 || vs  || Joker Marchant Stadium • Lakeland, Florida || 1–3 || 0–1 || –
|- bgcolor="#ccffcc"
| 2 || February 28 || vs  || Joker Marchant Stadium • Lakeland, Florida || 13–2 || 1–1 || –
|-

|- bgcolor="#ccffcc"
| 3 || March 1 || vs  || Joker Marchant Stadium • Lakeland, Florida || 5–4 || 2–1 || –
|- bgcolor="#ffcccc"
| 4 || March 1 || vs Western Michigan || Joker Marchant Stadium • Lakeland, Florida || 5–7 || 2–2 || –
|- bgcolor="#ccffcc"
| 5 || March 2 || vs Western Michigan || Joker Marchant Stadium • Lakeland, Florida || 11–8 || 3–2 || –
|- bgcolor="#ccffcc"
| 6 || March 3 || vs Evansville || Joker Marchant Stadium • Lakeland, Florida || 11–5 || 4–2 || –
|- bgcolor="#ccffcc"
| 7 || March 3 || vs Evansville || Joker Marchant Stadium • Lakeland, Florida || 5–1 || 5–2 || –
|- bgcolor="#ccffcc"
| 8 || March 4 || vs Eastern Michigan || Joker Marchant Stadium • Lakeland, Florida || 3–2 || 6–2 || –
|- bgcolor="#ccffcc"
| 9 || March 6 || vs  || Joker Marchant Stadium • Lakeland, Florida || 4–1 || 7–2 || –
|- bgcolor="#ccffcc"
| 10 || March 6 || vs Eastern Michigan || Joker Marchant Stadium • Lakeland, Florida || 1–0 || 8–2 || –
|- bgcolor="#ccffcc"
| 11 || March 8 || vs  || Unknown • Edinburg, Texas || 1–0 || 9–2 || –
|- bgcolor="#ccffcc"
| 12 || March 9 || vs Baylor || Unknown • Edinburg, Texas || 4–3 || 10–2 || –
|- bgcolor="#ccffcc"
| 13 || March 9 || at  || Unknown • Edinburg, Texas || 6–1 || 11–2 || –
|- bgcolor="#ffcccc"
| 14 || March 10 || at Texas–Pan American || Unknown • Edinburg, Texas || 8–9 || 11–3 || –
|- bgcolor="#ccffcc"
| 15 || March 11 || vs Baylor || Unknown • Edinburg, Texas || 10–4 || 12–3 || –
|- bgcolor="#ccffcc"
| 16 || March 12 || vs Baylor || Unknown • Edinburg, Texas || 6–2 || 13–3 || –
|- bgcolor="#ffcccc"
| 17 || March 12 || at Texas–Pan American || Unknown • Edinburg, Texas || 6–7 || 13–4 || –
|- bgcolor="#ffcccc"
| 18 || March 12 || at Texas–Pan American || Unknown • Edinburg, Texas || 4–5 || 13–5 || –
|- bgcolor="#ccffcc"
| 19 || March 19 ||  || Allie P. Reynolds Stadium • Stillwater, Oklahoma || 15–0 || 14–5 || –
|- bgcolor="#ccffcc"
| 20 || March 19 || South Dakota State || Allie P. Reynolds Stadium • Stillwater, Oklahoma || 20–0 || 15–5 || –
|- bgcolor="#ccffcc"
| 21 || March 20 || South Dakota State || Allie P. Reynolds Stadium • Stillwater, Oklahoma || 7–4 || 16–5 || –
|- bgcolor="#ccffcc"
| 22 || March 20 || South Dakota State || Allie P. Reynolds Stadium • Stillwater, Oklahoma || 13–3 || 17–5 || –
|- bgcolor="#ccffcc"
| 23 || March 23 ||  || Allie P. Reynolds Stadium • Stillwater, Oklahoma || 13–1 || 18–5 || –
|- bgcolor="#ccffcc"
| 24 || March 24 || North Dakota State || Allie P. Reynolds Stadium • Stillwater, Oklahoma || 23–1 || 19–5 || –
|- bgcolor="#ccffcc"
| 25 || March 24 || North Dakota State || Allie P. Reynolds Stadium • Stillwater, Oklahoma || 7–5 || 20–5 || –
|- bgcolor="#ccffcc"
| 26 || March 27 || at  || Buck Beltzer Stadium • Lincoln, Nebraska || 4–2 || 21–5 || 1–0
|- bgcolor="#ffcccc"
| 27 || March 27 || at Nebraska || Buck Beltzer Stadium • Lincoln, Nebraska || 3–4 || 21–6 || 1–1
|- bgcolor="#ffcccc"
| 28 || March 28 || at Nebraska || Buck Beltzer Stadium • Lincoln, Nebraska || 4–11 || 21–7 || 1–2
|- bgcolor="#ccffcc"
| 29 || March 29 || at Nebraska || Buck Beltzer Stadium • Lincoln, Nebraska || 11–10 || 22–7 || 2–2
|- bgcolor="#ccffcc"
| 30 || March 31 || at  || Jim Wade Stadium • Oklahoma City, Oklahoma || 14–4 || 23–7 || 2–2
|- bgcolor="#ffcccc"
| 31 || March 31 || at Oklahoma City || Jim Wade Stadium • Oklahoma City, Oklahoma || 1–7 || 23–8 || 2–2
|-

|- bgcolor="#ccffcc"
| 32 || April 3 ||  || Allie P. Reynolds Stadium • Stillwater, Oklahoma || 18–4 || 24–8 || 3–2
|- bgcolor="#ccffcc"
| 33 || April 3 || Iowa State || Allie P. Reynolds Stadium • Stillwater, Oklahoma || 20–7 || 25–8 || 4–2
|- bgcolor="#ccffcc"
| 34 || April 4 || Iowa State || Allie P. Reynolds Stadium • Stillwater, Oklahoma || 9–7 || 26–8 || 5–2
|- bgcolor="#ffcccc"
| 35 || April 4 || Iowa State || Allie P. Reynolds Stadium • Stillwater, Oklahoma || 0–3 || 26–9 || 5–3
|- bgcolor="#ffcccc"
| 36 || April 9 || at  || Unknown • Norman, Oklahoma || 5–7 || 26–10 || 5–4
|- bgcolor="#ccffcc"
| 37 || April 10 || at Oklahoma || Unknown • Norman, Oklahoma || 7–1 || 27–10 || 6–4
|- bgcolor="#ccffcc"
| 38 || April 10 || at Oklahoma || Unknown • Norman, Oklahoma || 21–8 || 28–10 || 7–4
|- bgcolor="#ccffcc"
| 39 || April 11 || at Oklahoma || Unknown • Norman, Oklahoma || 12–11 || 29–10 || 8–4
|- bgcolor="#ccffcc"
| 39 || April 14 ||  || Allie P. Reynolds Stadium • Stillwater, Oklahoma || 9–2 || 30–10 || 8–4
|- bgcolor="#ccffcc"
| 40 || April 16 || Oklahoma City || Allie P. Reynolds Stadium • Stillwater, Oklahoma || 7–6 || 31–10 || 8–4
|- bgcolor="#ccffcc"
| 41 || April 17 ||  || Allie P. Reynolds Stadium • Stillwater, Oklahoma || 12–3 || 32–10 || 9–4
|- bgcolor="#ccffcc"
| 42 || April 17 || Kansas State || Allie P. Reynolds Stadium • Stillwater, Oklahoma || 10–1 || 33–10 || 10–4
|- bgcolor="#ccffcc"
| 43 || April 18 || Kansas State || Allie P. Reynolds Stadium • Stillwater, Oklahoma || 15–2 || 34–10 || 11–4
|- bgcolor="#ccffcc"
| 44 || April 18 || Kansas State || Allie P. Reynolds Stadium • Stillwater, Oklahoma || 10–8 || 35–10 || 12–4
|- bgcolor="#ccffcc"
| 45 || April 21 ||  || Allie P. Reynolds Stadium • Stillwater, Oklahoma || 10–0 || 36–10 || 12–4
|- bgcolor="#ccffcc"
| 46 || April 21 || Arkansas–Little Rock || Allie P. Reynolds Stadium • Stillwater, Oklahoma || 7–4 || 37–10 || 12–4
|- bgcolor="#ccffcc"
| 47 || April 22 || Arkansas–Little Rock || Allie P. Reynolds Stadium • Stillwater, Oklahoma || 13–0 || 38–10 || 12–4
|- bgcolor="#ccffcc"
| 48 || April 23 ||  || Allie P. Reynolds Stadium • Stillwater, Oklahoma || 26–12 || 39–10 || 12–4
|- bgcolor="#ccffcc"
| 49 || April 24 || Missouri Southern || Allie P. Reynolds Stadium • Stillwater, Oklahoma || 8–7 || 40–10 || 12–4
|- bgcolor="#ccffcc"
| 50 || April 24 || Missouri Southern || Allie P. Reynolds Stadium • Stillwater, Oklahoma || 14–0 || 41–10 || 12–4
|- bgcolor="#ffcccc"
| 51 || April 27 || at Wichita State || Shocker Field • Wichita, Kansas || 3–8 || 41–11 || 12–4
|- bgcolor="#ffcccc"
| 52 || April 28 || at  || J. L. Johnson Stadium • Tulsa, Oklahoma || 3–7 || 41–12 || 12–4
|-

|- bgcolor="#ccffcc"
| 53 || May 1 || at  || Simmons Field • Columbia, Missouri || 6–4 || 42–12 || 13–4
|- bgcolor="#ccffcc"
| 54 || May 1 || at Missouri || Simmons Field • Columbia, Missouri || 7–4 || 43–12 || 14–4
|- bgcolor="#ccffcc"
| 55 || May 2 || at Missouri || Simmons Field • Columbia, Missouri || 3–2 || 44–12 || 15–4
|- bgcolor="#ccffcc"
| 56 || May 2 || at Missouri || Simmons Field • Columbia, Missouri || 5–4 || 45–12 || 16–4
|- bgcolor="#ffcccc"
| 57 || May 4 || Oklahoma City || Allie P. Reynolds Stadium • Stillwater, Oklahoma || 6–8 || 45–13 || 16–4
|- bgcolor="#ffcccc"
| 58 || May 8 ||  || Allie P. Reynolds Stadium • Stillwater, Oklahoma || 2–8 || 45–14 || 16–5
|- bgcolor="#ccffcc"
| 59 || May 8 || Kansas || Allie P. Reynolds Stadium • Stillwater, Oklahoma || 2–1 || 46–14 || 17–5
|- bgcolor="#ccffcc"
| 60 || May 9 || Kansas || Allie P. Reynolds Stadium • Stillwater, Oklahoma || 10–2 || 47–14 || 18–5
|- bgcolor="#ccffcc"
| 61 || May 9 || Kansas || Allie P. Reynolds Stadium • Stillwater, Oklahoma || 14–7 || 48–14 || 19–5
|-

|-
|-
! style="" | Postseason
|- valign="top" 

|- bgcolor="#ccffcc"
| 62 || May 14 || vs Missouri || Unknown • Oklahoma City, Oklahoma || 19–8 || 49–14 || 19–5
|- bgcolor="#ccffcc"
| 63 || May 15 || vs Oklahoma || Unknown • Oklahoma City, Oklahoma || 7–6 || 50–14 || 19–5
|- bgcolor="#ccffcc"
| 64 || May 16 || vs Oklahoma || Unknown • Oklahoma City, Oklahoma || 5–3 || 51–14 || 19–5
|-

|- bgcolor="#ccffcc"
| 65 || May 22 ||  || Allie P. Reynolds Stadium • Stillwater, Oklahoma || 3–2 || 52–14 || 19–5
|- bgcolor="#ccffcc"
| 66 || May 23 || Hardin–Simmons || Allie P. Reynolds Stadium • Stillwater, Oklahoma || 10–0 || 53–14 || 19–5
|-

|- bgcolor="#ccffcc"
| 67 || May 27 ||  || Allie P. Reynolds Stadium • Stillwater, Oklahoma || 16–9 || 54–14 || 19–5
|- bgcolor="#ccffcc"
| 68 || May 28 ||  || Allie P. Reynolds Stadium • Stillwater, Oklahoma || 5–3 || 55–14 || 19–5
|- bgcolor="#ccffcc"
| 69 || May 29 || Middle Tennessee || Allie P. Reynolds Stadium • Stillwater, Oklahoma || 7–3 || 56–14 || 19–5
|-

|- bgcolor="#ffcccc"
| 70 || June 5 || vs Texas || Johnny Rosenblatt Stadium • Omaha, Nebraska || 1–9 || 56–15 || 19–5
|- bgcolor="#ccffcc"
| 71 || June 6 || vs  || Johnny Rosenblatt Stadium • Omaha, Nebraska || 10–8 || 57–15 || 19–5
|- bgcolor="#ffcccc"
| 72 || June 9 || vs Wichita State || Johnny Rosenblatt Stadium • Omaha, Nebraska || 2–13 || 57–16 || 19–5
|-

Awards and honors 
Benji de la Rosa
Big Eight Conference All-Tournament Team
Big Eight Conference Tournament MVP

Don Freeman
Big Eight Conference All-Tournament Team

Gary Green
All-Big Eight Conference
Big Eight Conference All-Tournament Team

James Hudson
All-Big Eight Conference

Gary Kanwisher
Big Eight Conference All-Tournament Team

Kurt Leiter
All-Big Eight Conference

Dennis Livingston
Third Team All-American Baseball America

Scott Wade
Big Eight Conference All-Tournament Team

Robbie Wine
All-Big Eight Conference
Big Eight Conference All-Tournament Team
First Team All-American American Baseball Coaches Association
Second Team All-American Baseball America
The Sporting News College Baseball Player of the Year

References

Oklahoma State Cowboys baseball seasons
Oklahoma State Cowboys baseball
College World Series seasons
Oklahoma State
Big Eight Conference baseball champion seasons